The Beverage Institute for Health and Wellness, established in 2004 and based in Atlanta, GA is a front group set up by the Coca-Cola Company. The Institute is led by Rhona S. Applebaum, who is also the Coca-Cola Company's Chief Science and Health Officer. It was announced in 2005, when Coca-Cola executive Donald Short, then the company's vice president, published a paper about his company's commitments to consumers' health in the American Journal of Clinical Nutrition. Their paid advisers include Baylor College of Medicine researcher John Foreyt. The Institute "sponsors continuing professional education for registered dietitians, nurses and other professionals." This has led critics to say that "corporate influence is both tainting the Academy of Nutrition and Dietetics’s reputation and affecting its positions."

References

Coca-Cola